Lincoln Holroyd (May 9, 1881 – February 12, 1961) was a cornet soloist with Arthur Pryor, Patrick Conway (The Otsego Farmer, June 21, 1935) and appeared with the John Philip Sousa Band (Utica Observer, December 1943). He was an active performer, band leader and music educator in Utica, N.Y., from 1905 until his death in 1961.

Lincoln was the son of wool sorter Edwin Holroyd and grandson of the celebrated poet Abraham Holroyd of Bradford, England (b. April 2, 1815, d. January 1, 1888). Abraham's efforts were endorsed by wool manufacturer Titus Salt.

Lincoln Holroyd was born in Bradford, England, and emigrated to Bordentown New Jersey at the age of 12. Leaving School at the age of 15, he supported himself by working in stores while studying music and at 20 joined the Third Regiment Band of New Jersey. (Ziyara Bugle, February 1961).

Mr. Holroyd came to Utica, NY, in 1905 upon the invitation of Franz Rath (Utica Daily Press, February 14, 1961)

Cornet Soloist

Lincoln Holroyd's rich performing career is best evidenced by this profile which appeared in the Utica Observer on March 25, 1916:

Who's Who In Musical Utica

Prof. Lincoln Holroyd, Cornet Soloist, Conductor and Theatre Musician

Prof. Lincoln Holroyd, the well known bandmaster and cornet soloist has been engaged for his third season as
conductor of the Fort Dayton Band at Herkimer. The band under his direction, gives a concert every Friday
night throughout the summer, commencing in June.

Prof. Holroyd has been one of Utica's most active musicians for a number of years past. He is the conductor
of the Municipal Band, the cornetist at the Avon Theatre, and the instructor and conductor of the
children's band at the Masonic Home.

As a soloist, Prof. Holroyd enjoys a splendid reputation. Through recommendation of Prof. Franz Rath, he
was engaged as assistant soloist of the Denver Municipal Band of which Pat Conway, conductor of the famous
Conway's Band, was soloist and Enrico Garguilo was conductor. He assisted Mr. Conway in the making of his first
phonograph records.

For three years he was the soloist of the Third Regiment Band of New Jersey; for two seasons he was soloist
for Wilson's Band which played for the carnival during State Fair Week. He has also been a member of the
Lyceum Theatre Orchestra in Rochester under George Koehl, the director of the late Schubert Theater
String Orchestra.

For three years Prof. Holroyd was cornetist of Young's Pier Theatre Orchestra at Atlantic City and he was
encouraged to come to this city by B. A. Rolfe, who's musical sketches are the gems of Keith vaudeville and
are known throughout the United States.

Prof. Holroyd was elected president of the local branch of the American Federation of Musicians at its last
annual meeting and there is no other better equipped for the place. He enjoys a wide acquaintance in Utica and
various other cities where he has played and his artistic musicianship is appreciated by thousands of people.

His work as cornetist in the local first class theatres has brought him in contact with many musicians.
Besides being a real musician, Prof. Holroyd is gifted with a genial disposition and the faculty of making
friends. He is a teacher of considerable reputation and in numerous ways has made his part in music affairs
interesting.(Utica Observer, March 25, 1916)

The following excerpt from the "Catalogue of the Utica Conservatory of Music 1922-1923" places him as the Brass Instructor at the Conservatory and cornet soloist at the Majestic Theater (both posts formerly occupied by B.A. Rolfe).

"Mr. Holroyd was for three years soloist with the Third Regiment Band of New Jersey,three years cornet soloist at Young's Pier, Atlantic City, and since residing in Utica, was cornet soloist with the Majestic Theater Orchestra, under the direction of Franz Rath. For some time he occupied the position as assistant solo cornet with Pat Conway's famous band."
(Catalogue of the Utica Conservatory of Music 1922-1923).

Herbert L. Clarke, cornet soloist of the John Philip Sousa Band, was entertained by Lincoln Holroyd of Lansing St.
while in the city of Utica for two performances at the Majestic Theater. (Utica Herald Dispatch, November 9, 1912)

Band Director / Organizer

In May 1921, he joined the Shriner's Ziyara Temple, based in Utica, and "the organization of the band immediately begun" (Ziyara Bugle, February 1961). He held the position of band leader for 40 years until retiring from the post on February 2, 1961.

Among the bands he directed and organized were the Utica Free Academy, Proctor High School, Ziyara Shrine Temple, Boy's Club and The Masonic Home Band.
(Utica Observer Dispatch, February 13, 1961).

On August 1, 1924, Holroyd's Municipal Band was filmed on Genesee Street in a silent movie titled "Clothes" directed by A.J. Cunningham
(Utica Observer Dispatch, August 1, 1924)

Death

Lincoln remained active as a band director and performer until the day he died. According to the Ziyara Bugle, he attended morning rehearsal, "directed the Band for the first selection and then finished the entire rehearsal in the ranks."

Later that evening, he suffered a heart attack and died on Sunday, February 12, 1961. He was 79.

References
1. Utica Herald Dispatch, November 9, 1912
2. Utica Observer, March 25, 1916
3. Catalogue of the Utica Conservatory of Music 1922-1923 
4. Utica Observer Dispatch, August 1, 1924
5. The Otsego Farmer, June 21, 1935
6. The Utica Observer, December 1943
7. The Ziyara Bugle, February 1961
8. Utica Observer Dispatch, February 13, 1961
9. Utica Daily Press, February 14, 1961
10. Birth Certificate, Lincoln Holroyd
11. 1871 Census, Bradford, England

External links
Catalogue of the Utica Conservatory of Music 1922-1923 http://hdl.handle.net/1802/8109
Holroyd's Collection of Yorkshire Ballads https://archive.org/details/holroydscollecti00holrrich
Old Fulton NY Postcards http://www.fultonhistory.com/Fulton.html

1881 births
1961 deaths
20th-century American conductors (music)
20th-century classical musicians
20th-century trumpeters
American bandleaders
American classical musicians
American classical trumpeters
American conductors (music)
American cornetists
American male conductors (music)
American male trumpeters
20th-century American male musicians